This is a list of cities and towns in Russia. According to the data of 2010 Russian Census, there are 1,117 cities and towns in Russia. After the Census, Innopolis, a town in the Republic of Tatarstan, was established in 2012 and granted town status in 2015.

List

Gallery

See also
Types of inhabited localities in Russia
List of renamed cities and towns in Russia
List of cities in Asia
List of cities in Europe

References

External links
List of all places in Russia (2002 census)
Russian places with 2002 census population data (Excel file)

 
 
Cities and towns
Russia
Russia